Silvino Francisco (born 3 May 1946) is a South African former professional snooker player, most notable for winning the 1985 British Open.

Snooker career
Francisco comes from a snooker-playing family. His brother Manuel and nephew Peter both played at a high level, Manuel having been a runner-up in the World Amateur Billiards Championship on several occasions, and Peter having risen to the world ranking of number 14.

Francisco won the 1985 British Open, beating Kirk Stevens 12–9. Prior to the start of the Final match, Francisco accused Stevens of playing under the influence of drugs. Francisco was subsequently fined for the comments. The world governing body of snooker, the WPBSA, accepted that the accusation was false and it is on record that Kirk Stevens has never failed a drugs test in the history of his career. Stevens later admitted to have an addiction to cocaine.

He was involved in another scandal after the 1989 Masters. After losing 5–1 to Terry Griffiths in the last-16, it was discovered that there had been heavy betting on that exact score. Francisco was arrested, but later released without charge.

Personal life
Francisco suffered with gambling problems towards the end of his professional career, to the extent of being declared bankrupt in 1996 due to income tax arrears, having split up from his second wife who claimed his £350,000 house, and having to pay maintenance for his four children. He later took to working evenings in a friend's fish and chip shop for extra cash.

In 1997, he was arrested for smuggling cannabis, and served three years in prison.

Performance and rankings timeline

Career finals

Ranking finals: 1 (1 title)

Non-ranking finals: 3 (1 title)

Team finals: 1

Amateur finals: 4 (4 titles)

References

1946 births
Living people
South African snooker players
South African people of Hispanic descent
Sportspeople from Cape Town